Clarence LeRoy Van Cleef Jr. (January 9, 1925 – December 16, 1989) was an American actor. He appeared in over 170 film and television roles in a career spanning nearly 40 years, but is best known as a star of Italian Spaghetti Westerns, particularly the Sergio Leone-directed Dollars Trilogy films For a Few Dollars More (1965) and The Good, the Bad and the Ugly (1966).

Born and raised in New Jersey, Van Cleef served in the United States Navy during World War II aboard a minesweeper, earning a Bronze Star for his actions. After acting on stage in regional theatre, he made his film debut in the Oscar-winning Western High Noon (1952) in a non-speaking outlaw cast role. With distinctive, angular features and a taciturn screen persona, Van Cleef was typecast as minor villain and supporting player in Westerns and crime dramas. After suffering serious injuries in a car crash, Van Cleef's acting career started to decline. However, he achieved unexpected stardom when director Sergio Leone offered him the co-leading role in For a Few Dollars More. The film proved to be a huge hit and cited him as a box-office draw, largely in Europe. 

Van Cleef went on to appear in such films as Leone's The Good, the Bad and the Ugly (1966), Death Rides a Horse (1967), Day of Anger (also 1967), Sabata (1969) and its sequel Return of Sabata (1971), El Condor (1970), The Magnificent Seven Ride! (1972), Mean Frank and Crazy Tony (1973), Take a Hard Ride (1975), The Octagon (1980), Escape from New York (1981) and Speed Zone (1989). He also played the lead role of John Peter McAllister on the martial arts television series The Master (1984).

Early life 
Lee Van Cleef was born on January 9, 1925, in Somerville, New Jersey, to Marion Lavinia Van Fleet and Clarence LeRoy Van Cleef. Lee graduated high school early at the age of 17  from Somerville High School New Jersey in order to enlist in the United States Navy in September 1942.

Military service 

The ship initially patrolled the Caribbean, then moved to the Mediterranean, participating in the landings in southern France. In January 1945, Incredible moved to the Black Sea, and performed sweeping duties out of the Soviet Navy base at Sevastopol, Crimea. Afterwards, the ship performed air-sea rescue patrols in the Black Sea before returning to Palermo, Sicily. 

By the time of his discharge in March 1946, he had achieved the rank of Sonarman First Class (SO1) and had earned his mine sweeper patch. He also had been awarded the Bronze Star and the Good Conduct Medal. By virtue of his deployments, Van Cleef also qualified for the European-African-Middle Eastern Campaign Medal, Asiatic-Pacific Campaign Medal, the American Campaign Medal, and the World War II Victory Medal. He was discharged from the Navy in 1946.

Acting career 
After leaving the Navy, Van Cleef received his first acting role as a reader for the play Our Town at the Little Theater Group in Clinton, New Jersey.  From there, he continued to meet with the group and audition for parts. The next biggest part was that of the boxer, Joe Pendleton, in the play Heaven Can Wait. During this time, he was observed by visiting talent scouts, who were impressed by Van Cleef's stage presence and delivery. One of these scouts later took him to New York City talent agent Maynard Morris of the MCA agency, who then sent him to the Alvin Theater for an audition. The play was Mister Roberts.

Van Cleef's screen debut came in High Noon. During a performance of Mister Roberts in Los Angeles, he was noticed by film producer Stanley Kramer, who offered Van Cleef a role in his upcoming film. Kramer originally wanted Van Cleef for the role of the deputy Harvey Pell, but as he wanted Van Cleef to have his "distinctive nose" fixed, Van Cleef declined the role in favor of the part of the silent gunslinger Jack Colby. He was then cast mostly in villainous roles, due to his sharp cheeks and chin, piercing eyes, and hawk-like nose, from the part of Tony Romano in Kansas City Confidential (1952), culminating 14 years later in Sergio Leone's The Good, the Bad and the Ugly (1966).

Aside from Westerns and the science fiction films, three of his early major roles were in noir films, Kansas City Confidential (1952), Vice Squad (1953) and The Big Combo (1955). 

In 1952, he made his television debut when he was cast in the episode "Formula for Fear" of the Western aviation series Sky King. Van Cleef appeared six times between 1953 and 1955 on the children's syndicated Western series The Adventures of Kit Carson, starring Bill Williams. He was cast three times, including the role of Rocky Hatch in the episode "Greed Rides the Range" (1952), of another syndicated Western series, The Range Rider.  He appeared in episode 82 of the TV series The Lone Ranger in 1952. In 1954, Van Cleef appeared as Jesse James in the syndicated series Stories of the Century.

In 1955, he was cast twice on another syndicated Western series, Annie Oakley. That same year, he guest-starred on the CBS Western series Brave Eagle. In 1955, he played one of the two villains in an episode of The Adventures of Champion the Wonder Horse. He played Cherokee Bob in the NBC Western series Tales of Wells Fargo in 1957. In 1958, he was cast as Ed Murdock, a rodeo performer trying to reclaim the title in the event at Madison Square Garden in New York City, on Richard Diamond, Private Detective.

Van Cleef played different characters on four episodes of ABC's The Rifleman, with Chuck Connors, between 1959 and 1962, and twice on ABC's Tombstone Territory. In 1958, he was cast as Deputy Sid Carver in the episode "The Great Stagecoach Robbery" of another syndicated Western series, Frontier Doctor, starring Rex Allen. In 1959, Van Cleef appeared as Luke Clagg in the episode "Strange Request" of the NBC Western series Riverboat starring Darren McGavin, as Jumbo Kane in the episode "The Hostage" on the CBS Western series "Wanted Dead or Alive" starring Steve McQueen, and in an episode of Maverick titled "Red Dog" in 1961 starring Roger Moore and John Carradine.

Van Cleef played a sentry on an episode of the ABC sitcom The Real McCoys, with Walter Brennan. Van Cleef was cast with Pippa Scott and again with Chuck Connors in the 1960 episode "Trial by Fear" of the CBS anthology series The DuPont Show with June Allyson. A young Van Cleef also made an appearance on The Andy Griffith Show and as Frank Diamond in The Untouchables, in an episode entitled "The Unhired Assassin". He also appeared in an episode of the ABC/Warner Brothers Western series The Alaskans.

Van Cleef guest-starred on the CBS Western series Have Gun – Will Travel, on the ABC/Warner Bros. series Colt .45, on the NBC Western series Cimarron City and Laramie, and on Rod Cameron's syndicated crime dramas City Detective and State Trooper. He guest-starred in an episode of John Bromfield's syndicated crime drama Sheriff of Cochise. Van Cleef starred as minor villains and henchmen in various Westerns, including The Tin Star and Gunfight at the O.K. Corral. His film characters died in many of his Westerns and gangster portrayals.

In 1960, he appeared as a villainous swindler in the Bonanza episode, "The Bloodline" (December 31, 1960) and also made an appearance on Gunsmoke. In 1961, he played a role on episode 7 ("The Grave") of the third season of The Twilight Zone starring Lee Marvin. He played a villainous henchman of Lee Marvin's titular character in the 1962 John Ford movie The Man Who Shot Liberty Valance starring John Wayne and James Stewart. In 1963, he appeared on Perry Mason (episode: "The Case of the Golden Oranges"). That same year, he appeared in "The Day of the Misfits" on The Travels of Jaimie McPheeters.

Stardom 

In 1965, Sergio Leone cast Van Cleef, whose career had yet to take off, as a main protagonist alongside Clint Eastwood in For a Few Dollars More. Leone then chose Van Cleef to appear again with Eastwood, this time as the primary antagonist, Angel Eyes, in the now seminal Western The Good, the Bad and the Ugly (1966). 

With his roles in Leone's films, Van Cleef became a major star of Spaghetti Westerns, playing central, and often surprisingly heroic, roles in films such as The Big Gundown (1966), Death Rides a Horse (1967), Day of Anger (1967), and The Grand Duel (1972). He played the title role in Sabata (1969) and Return of Sabata (1971), and co-starred with Jim Brown in an Italian-American co-production, Take a Hard Ride (1975). In two of his final westerns he co-starred with Leif Garrett in God's Gun (1976) and Kid Vengeance (1977), both of which were filmed mainly in Israel. 

Van Cleef later had a supporting role in John Carpenter's cult film Escape from New York (1981). He slipped out of the limelight in his later years. In 1984, he was cast as a ninja master in the NBC adventure series The Master, but it was canceled after thirteen episodes. In all, Van Cleef is credited with 90 movie roles and 109 television appearances over a 38-year span.

Personal life 
Van Cleef was married three times. His first marriage was to Patsy Ruth Kahle, in 1943. They had three children, Alan, Deborah and David, and divorced in 1958. His second marriage was to Joan Marjorie Drane, from 1960 to 1974. His final marriage was to Barbara Havelone in 1976, who survived him.

He lost the last joint of the middle finger of his right hand while building a playhouse for his daughter. 

In 1958, a severe car crash nearly cost Van Cleef his life and career. A resulting knee injury made his physicians think that he would never ride a horse again. This injury plagued Van Cleef for the rest of his life and caused him great pain. His recovery was long and difficult and halted his acting for a time. He then began a business in interior decoration with second wife Joan, as well as pursuing his talent for painting, primarily of sea and landscapes.

Death

Despite suffering from heart disease from the late 1970s and having a pacemaker installed in the early 1980s, Van Cleef continued to work in films until his death on December 16, 1989, at age 64. He collapsed in his home in Oxnard, California, from a heart attack. Throat cancer was listed as a secondary cause of death. He was buried at Forest Lawn Memorial Park Cemetery, Hollywood Hills, California, with an inscription on his grave marker referring to his many acting performances as a villain: "BEST OF THE BAD".

Filmography

Film

Television

In popular culture 

 Lee Van Cleef's characters in the Sergio Leone movies inspired the creation of the characters Elliot Belt of the Lucky Luke comic album The Bounty Hunter, and Cad Bane of the Star Wars franchise.
 The band Primus has a song about Lee Van Cleef on their album Green Naugahyde.
 Guitarist and ex-Guns N' Roses member Ron Thal recorded an instrumental piece titled "The Legend of Van Cleef".
 The Warcraft universe features the villain Edwin Van Cleef, inspired by Lee Van Cleef.
 The Black Library magazine Inferno! featured several short stories, within the Necromunda setting, starring a bounty hunter named Nathan Creed, who was written as a homage to Lee Van Cleef; writer Jonathan Green described the character as "Lee Van Cleef, Clint Eastwood, The Man With No Name and John Wayne all rolled into one", and illustrations in the magazine clearly showed Creed as physically nearly identical to Van Cleef.
 Philip Pullman, author of the bestselling trilogy His Dark Materials, stated that the first name of his fictional American explorer, airman, and crack marksman Lee Scoresby was a reference to Van Cleef, with the character's surname as an homage to the famous Arctic explorer William Scoresby.
 Van Cleef was parodied in GLC: The Carnage Continues..., a short British comedy film of the late 1980s that humorously joined British politics with Hollywood action stars. Van Cleef is portrayed by the film's director Peter Richardson, though it rather suggests Van Cleef the personage is unrealistically playing Tony Benn, a British member of Parliament.
 Van Cleef served as visual inspiration for the characters of Revolver Ocelot and Old Snake in the Metal Gear Solid video game series as well as inspiring the gunslinger personality of the former.
 Hungarian musician Tamás Cseh wrote the song "Lee van Cleef".
British singers Paul Heaton and Jacqui Abbott mention Lee and Clint Eastwood in the song, "When I Get Back to Blighty".
Stargate SG-1 has references to Lee Van Cleef in Season 4, Episode 20 "Entity". The 'Entity' is searching through personnel files on a projected computer screen, with the first listed name that shows up as Lee Van Cleef, with team designation "SG-1" and a rank of "Master". His name appears several more times with pictures of different people.

References

External links 

 TheBad.net: A Tribute to Lee Van Cleef

1925 births
1989 deaths
20th-century American male actors
American male film actors
American male television actors
American people of Dutch descent
American people of English descent
American people of German descent
Burials at Forest Lawn Memorial Park (Hollywood Hills)
Male Spaghetti Western actors
Male Western (genre) film actors
Male actors from Los Angeles
Male actors from New Jersey
Male actors from Oxnard, California
Male actors from Somerville, New Jersey
Somerville High School (New Jersey) alumni
United States Navy personnel of World War II
United States Navy sailors
Western (genre) television actors
Deaths from throat cancer
Deaths from cancer in California